Aureusidin is an aurone, a type of flavonoid.

Metabolism 
Aureusidin synthase is an enzyme found in Antirrhinum majus (Garden snapdragon).

References 

Aurones
Catechols
Resorcinols